Hermine Nantes Basket, also known as simply Nantes, is a professional basketball team based in Nantes, France. The team currently plays in French LNB Pro B, the second national level. The Palais des Sports de Beaulieu is the home arena of the team.

Honours
LNB Pro B Leaders Cup
Winners (1): 2020

Season by season

Notable players

External links
Profile at LNB.fr
Team Profile at Eurobasket.com

Basketball teams established in 1932
Sport in Nantes
Basketball teams in France